is a Japanese children's novel series written by Reiko Hiroshima, with illustrations by Jyajya. Kaiseisha have published 18 volumes since May 2013. An anime television series adaptation by Toei Animation premiered on September 8, 2020. It was also adapted by Toei into a segment of the omnibus film Toei Manga Matsuri, titled Fushigi Dagashiya Zenitendō: Tsuritai Yaki, which was originally scheduled to premiere in Japanese theatres on April 24, 2020, but was postponed to August 14, 2020, as a result of the COVID-19 pandemic.

Characters

Notes

References

External links
Book Information / Fushigi Candy Store Sentendo Official Site - Kaiseisha
Fushigi Candy Store Sentendo Anime Official Site by Toei Animation

2013 Japanese novels
2020 anime television series debuts
Anime and manga based on novels
Anime postponed due to the COVID-19 pandemic
Book series introduced in 2013
Japanese children's novels
Japanese serial novels
NHK original programming
Toei Animation television